Kenneth Farrow II  (born March 7, 1993) is an American football running back for the Arlington Renegades of the XFL. He played college football at Houston and signed with the San Diego Chargers as an undrafted free agent in 2016.

College career

2011
Farrow began attending the University of Houston in 2011 and subsequently redshirted his first year and did not play.

2012
The following year, he was slated as the backup behind Charles Sims. On October 6, 2012, he carried the ball 8 times for 85 yards and scored his first career rushing touchdown against North Texas. On October 27, 2012, he received his first career start against UTEP and finished the 45-35 victory with 8 carries for 28-yards. He finished his second season at Houston with 86 carries for 466 rushing yards and two touchdowns while playing in 13 games and starting 3 of them.

2013
With Sims transferring out to West Virginia, Farrow became the de facto starter to begin the 2013 season. He opened the season rushing for a season-high 97-yards on 20 carries against Southern. The following week, he had 9 rushing attempts for 78 rushing yards during a Week 2 victory over Temple. He missed Weeks 3 and 4 due to a lower leg injury but returned during Week 5 and had 15 carries for 33 rushing yards and two touchdowns in a game against Temple. He finished his sophomore season with 103 rushing attempts for 514 rushing yards and six rushing touchdowns while starting 11 of 13 games he appeared in. Farrow also managed to make 24 catches for 113 receiving yards and one touchdown during his third season with Houston.

2014
He began 2014 being voted as a captain for the Houston Cougars and rushing for 21 yards on 7 carries in the Cougar's season opening loss to UTSA. The following game, he had managed to rush for a season-high 130 yards on 13 attempts and scored his first rushing touchdown of the season against Grambling State. On September 20, 2014, Farrow carried the ball 14 times for 113 yards and one touchdown in a win over Nevada-Las Vegas. On November 1, 2014, he carried the ball a season-high 22 times for 112 rushing yards and a touchdown while also making two receptions for 7 yards and his first touchdown reception of the season against USF. During a Week 10 matchup against the Tulsa, he had 21 carries for 116 rushing yards and scored a career-high 4 rushing touchdowns. The following week, he had 18 rushing attempts for 110 rushing yards and two touchdowns in a 35-9 victory of SMU. The next game at University of Cincinnati, he had 19 carries for a season-high 143 rushing yards and one touchdown. This marked his third consecutive game with over 100 rushing yards and one touchdown. On January 2, 2015, the Houston Cougars played in the 2015 Armed Forces Bowl against Pittsburgh and Farrow won the MVP award after he carried the ball 22 times for 103 yards and two rushing touchdowns to help his team win, 35–34. He finished his junior year with 186 carries for 1,042 rushing yards and 14 rushing touchdowns while also making 20 catches for 149 receiving yards and a touchdown. He played in all 13 games and started 12 of them.

2015
Despite having a strong performance during his junior season, Farrow decided to forgo the 2015 NFL Draft and return to Houston for his senior season and was voted a team captain for his third consecutive year. In the Cougar's season opener against Tennessee Tech, Farrow carried the ball 11 times for only 49-yards. On October 3, 2015, he had 19 carries for 159 rushing yards and scored two rushing touchdowns in the Cougar's victory over Tulsa. The following game, he only had 11 carries for 40-yards but managed to score 3 rushing touchdowns to help Houston win 49-38 against SMU. On October 24, 2015, Farrow rushed for a career-high 167-yards on 13 attempts and scored three touchdowns to help Houston get their seventh win of the season against UCF. During a Week 9 contest against Cincinnati, he had 30 rushing attempts for 106-yards and a touchdown. The next game he helped #16 Houston Cougars defeat #25 Memphis after scoring two rushing touchdowns. On November 21, 2015, Houston lost their only game of the season against UConn with Farrow being held without a touchdown after being held to 46-yards on 14 attempts. He would miss the next two games due to an injury but managed to return for #14 Houston's matchup against #9 Florida State in the Peach Bowl. Although he only carried the ball 3 times for 9-yards, Houston still managed to win 38-24 to end their season with a 12-1 record. He finished his last year at Houston with a total of 185 carries for 958 rushing yards and 12 touchdowns while also making 10 catches for 119 receiving yards. During his senior season, he only appeared in 11 games but started all of them.

He finished his five-year career at Houston with 560 carries for 2,980 rushing yards, which was for an average of 5.6 yards per carry, and scored 34 rushing touchdowns. Farrow also made 74 receptions for 546 receiving yards and three receiving touchdowns.

Career college statistics

Professional career
Coming out of college, Farrow was not a highly touted prospect and was only projected by most analysts to be selected in the sixth or seventh rounds or to be a high-priority free agent after the draft. He was ranked as the 31st best runningback out of the 204 available in the draft by NFLDraftScout.com. He did not receive an invitation to the combine but did participate in Houston's annual Pro Day.

San Diego / Los Angeles Chargers
After going undrafted in the 2016 NFL Draft, Farrow was immediately signed as an undrafted free agent by the San Diego Chargers. He began the season as the third running back on the depth chart after Branden Oliver tore his Achilles tendon during the pre-season. He received his first playing time on September 18, 2016, after backup Danny Woodhead tore an ACL and was placed on injured reserve for the remainder of the season. He finished his professional debut against the Jacksonville Jaguars with 4 carries for 13 yards. He earned his first starts in Weeks 15 and 16 after an injury to Melvin Gordon. He was placed on injured reserve on December 26, 2016 with a shoulder injury.

On September 2, 2017, Farrow was waived/injured by the Chargers and placed on injured reserve.

On April 13, 2018, Farrow was waived by the Chargers.

New England Patriots
On August 27, 2018, Farrow was signed by the New England Patriots. He was waived on September 1, 2018 and was later re-signed to the practice squad. He was released on September 20, 2018, but was re-signed on October 9, 2018. He was released on November 6, 2018.

San Antonio Commanders
In December 2018, Farrow signed with the San Antonio Commanders of the AAF. During week four of the 2019 AAF season, Farrow recorded 142 yards on 30 attempts (4.7 yards per carry) against the undefeated Birmingham Iron's second-ranked defense to lead San Antonio to a 12–11 win; he was later named AAF Offensive Player of the Week.

Miami Dolphins
After the AAF suspended football operations, Farrow signed with the Miami Dolphins on April 9, 2019. He was released during final roster cuts on August 31, 2019.

Seattle Dragons
Farrow was drafted by the Seattle Dragons in the 2020 XFL Draft. He had his contract terminated when the league suspended operations on April 10, 2020.

Arlington Renegades
Farrow was selected by the Arlington Renegades in the 2023 XFL Draft. He signed with the team on March 3, 2023.

Career statistics

References

External links
Los Angeles Chargers bio
Houston Cougars bio

1993 births
Living people
American football running backs
Arlington Renegades players
Houston Cougars football players
Los Angeles Chargers players
Miami Dolphins players
New England Patriots players
People from Hurst, Texas
Players of American football from Texas
San Antonio Commanders players
San Diego Chargers players
Seattle Dragons players
Sportspeople from the Dallas–Fort Worth metroplex